Devudu Narasimha Sastry (ದೇವುಡು ನರಸಿಂಹಶಾಸ್ತ್ರಿ. 29 December 1886 - 27 October 1962), known popularly by his pen-name Devudu was an eminent Kannada writer and novelist, Sanskrit scholar, actor and a journalist. His guru was Mahamahopadhyaya Vaidhyanatha Shastri.

Mimansa Darpana, his commentary on the Indian philosophy of Mimāṃsā, is ranked highly among works on the subject. Antaranga, his novel published in 1932, was the first novel in Kannada to employ the method of monologue narrative. In 1947, he published his most notable novel, Maha Brahmana ("The Great Brahmin") based on the life of the sage Vishwamitra. Mahākṣatriya ("The Great Warrior"), published in 1960 depicts the life and deeds of King Nahusha. This novel was awarded the Sahitya Akademi Award, the most prestigious literary merit awarded by the Government of India. Devudu's last novel, Maha Darshana ("The Great Vision") is based on the life of sage Yajnavalkya. The book was published after his death in 1962.

Childhood and education
Devudu was born on 7 December in a Vedic tradition. His mother was Subbamma; Father was Krishnasthani. His father died when he was 2 years old. Devudu, who learned Sanskrit Amarakosha, Sabda and Raghuvamsha as a child at the age of 5, had his primary, secondary and college education in Mysore. He was a student of the Maharaja College of Mysore and the University of Mysore. In MA he chose Sanskrit and Philosophy as the subject of study.

Family life
In 1912, when Devudu was 16, he married his wife, Gauramma. They had three sons and six daughters. The first son died prematurely at an early age.

Career
1923-1924 During this period, Devudu became headmaster at sadvidyā pāṭhaśāle, Mysore. Sometime in Sringeri's Sankaracharya monastery he functioned as a Peshkar. He came to Bangalore from 1924 to 1929 and became headmaster of the Arya Vidyalaya. He left the institution for several years and founded the Gandhinagar High School for five years.

Journalism
He entered journalism in 1927 as the editor of "Navajivana", and in 1936 and 1938 was editor of the theater magazine. From 1936
to 1957, he ran a free children's magazine called "Namma Pustaka" - for 21 years. He also edited the Kannada Sahitya Parishad newspaper in 1935-1936.

Hobbies and Amateur work
Devudu's two other hobbies were drama and literature. In 1921, he acted in several plays as an actor in Chamundeshwari Company. In 1926 he was a member of the Amateur Company. He founded the Karnataka Film Corporation in 1928. In 1934 he wrote the script for the film "Bhakta Dhruva". In 1936, he wrote the script for the film "Chiranjeevi" and played the role of sage Mṛkaṃḍu.

Cultural and Social Work
Devudu founded the Kannada Sahitya society in 1937. From 1939 to 1942 he was involved in the Mysore Province's Adult Literacy Schemes. He was a member of the Mysore Democratic Party in 1943-1945. In 1946 he was a Director and Textbook Committee of Bangalore City Cooperative Bank. In 1948 he was elected a member of the Bangalore City Corporation. He was also involved in the Karnataka unification struggle. In 1950, he founded the Gīrvāṇavidyāpīṭha in Sankarapuram. He was a member of the Working Committee of the Kannada Sahitya Parishad in 1956-1959.

Literature
Devudu is a major writer in Kannada. He has written in many genres of literature. His greatness is the imagination, etymology, and realism found in his literature. His first work was a spy novel "sāhasavarma". He was 16 when this was written (1912). In 1920, he wrote a comprehensive definition for "pūrvamegha".
At the suggestion of Devudu, Kengal Hanumanthayan opened the Kannada Culture Development Department and asked him to become director. But Devudu disagreed and suggested Sri CK Venkataramaiah.

Personality
Devudu read the Ramayana, Mahabharata, Bhagavata, and Brahmandapurana when he was in primary school. "When Krishna played the flute, all the trees and the trees sprouted, yet why did the flute not sprout?" - When the women were discussing this question of a pastor, it was the young boy who gave the consolation, "It was afraid of Krishna throwing it away." At the same time, he participated in all kinds of games and paid attention to bodybuilding.

For over four years of his life, Devudu wrote hundreds of articles and speeches to promote culture, the message of the Bhagavad Gita. The news of the death of his eldest son Ramu came to light when he was lecturing about the song in Udupi. Without a pause, he finished his speech. When he left the stage shortly after, friends became aware of his stoic and detached character, as prescribed in the Bahagavad Gita.

Awards 
Special Award by The Maharaja of Mysore for "mīmāṃsā darpaṇa" in 1938

Honored by Dr. Rajendra Prasad, the first President of India in 1952; President of the Kannada Novelists Conference in 1952

In 1963, the novel "mahākṣatriya" was posthumously awarded the Central Sahitya Akademi Award.

End 
Despite his cultural affluence, he lived in poverty. One of his disciples, who thought he was walking barefoot, bought a pair of slippers that injured his leg. In 1959, a collar had to be removed because of diabetes. This led to the end of his public life.

Death
Devudu died on October 27, 1962.

Notable writings

Commentary
Mimansa Darpana (1930) (Commentary)

Novel
Mayura (Historical)
Bhāratada mahāpuruṣaru
Antaranga (1932)
Maha Brahmana (1947)
Mahākṣatriya (1960) (Novel)
Maha Darshana
Karanataka Samskruti (Cultural Treatise)
Solo-geluvo
Avala Janma
Dr Veena
Mahabharatha
Chinna – Vijayanagara Raja Nartaki
Ramayanada Mahapurusharu
Geddavaru Yaaru?
Malli
MahaDarshana
Odeda Mutthu
Sampoorana Valmiki Ramayana

Other
Yoga Vasista – (7 Vols)

Short stories
Devudu Avara Sannakathegalu
Buddhiya Kathegalu

References

Encyclopedia of Indian Literature published by Sahitya Akademi, New Delhi.

19th-century births
1962 deaths
Kannada-language writers
20th-century Indian novelists
20th-century Indian short story writers
Recipients of the Sahitya Akademi Award in Kannada